The Great Northern Railway J4 Class was a class of 322 0-6-0 steam locomotives, introduced in 1882 designed by Patrick Stirling for goods traffic. Just over half of these were rebuilt by Nigel Gresley to a design by Henry Ivatt between 1912 and 1929.

GNR Class J5/LNER Class J4
The GNR Class J5 was based on the GNR Class J7 0-6-0 tender engines designed by Patrick Stirling, thirty-five of which were built at Doncaster between 1867 and 1873, these had cylinders of  stroke and domeless boilers of  diameter.

Between 1873 and 1879, 28 of these were built, after which the boiler was enlarged to  diameter, and 132 more were built down to 1896. That year, Stirling introduced the GNR Class J5, with the boiler diameter increased to  but still domeless, and ten were built. After Stirling's death, Ivatt amended this design to use a domed boiler of the same size and produced a further 145 between 1897 and 1901, of which twelve were supplied to the Midland and Great Northern Joint Railway (M&GN) in 1900 as their Class DA.

As older locomotives became due for boiler renewals, they were normally given the latest type; in this way, 145 of the 160 J6s were rebuilt to GNR Class J5; similarly, 153 of the J5s (including some former J6s) were rebuilt to GNR Class J4.

Numbering
The GNR Class J6 and J5 locomotives were given numbers 101/2, 133/5, 141/3/7, 150/4, 160/3/5/8, 170/1/3/5–83/7, 191–6/8/9, 300–4/6–310/2–324, 327–332/4/6–354, 359–365/7/8, 370–3/5/8/9/81–94/6/8/9, 640–51, 716–50, 791–800, 831–50, 1011/2, 1031–45, 1081–1173. Those numbered below 400 took the numbers of older locomotives that had been withdrawn. The twelve M&GN locomotives were numbered 81–92.

GNR Class J4/LNER Class J3
In 1912, Gresley produced a new boiler with a 4-foot 8-inch diameter and a total firebox area of 105 square feet. This was designed to be used on the D2 Class 4-4-0s and the J5s. The first member to be rebuilt was No. 1163 in May, being reclassified as J4. The GNR rebuilt 70 more to this specification. Upon the Groupings of 1923, the class became the LNER J3s. The LNER also rebuilt 82 locomotives, with the last rebuild occurring in 1929. By this point, there were only 157 J4s left in service. From 1926 onwards, the J3s were refitted with Ross pop safety valves, as was standard on the LNER. In service, the J3s handled the same duties as the J4s. However, they could also be found on Sunday school excursions from London to Southend-on-Sea, as well as many other excursions.

ROD Service
Twenty-six J5s were loaned to the ROD during the First World War, being sent to France alongside many other locomotives from other companies. Before going to France, the J4s were given boiler feed pumps and condensing gear. However, this was removed upon their return in 1918.

Preservation
None of the J4s survived into preservation.

Sources

External links 

 LNER Encyclopedia
 Class J3 Details at Rail UK

J04
0-6-0 locomotives
Railway locomotives introduced in 1882
Scrapped locomotives
Standard gauge steam locomotives of Great Britain
Freight locomotives
Railway Operating Division locomotives